Vassili Karis (born Vassilis Karamesinis on  22 September 1938) is a Greek-born Italian actor, mainly active in the Spaghetti Western film genre.

Life and career 
Born  in Patras, Karis was first active in the peplum genre, in which he was credited with his birth name or with the stage name Marco Vassilli. Adopted his definitive stage name, he got his first role of weight in 1966, in the  Spaghetti Western film Five Giants from Texas.  His breakout came in the early 1970s with the role of Holy Ghost ("Spirito Santo" in Italian) in a series of western comedy films. The decline of the western genre happened and he slowed his activities, retiring in the mid-1990s.

Selected filmography 
 3 Avengers (1964)
 I criminali della metropoli (1965)
 An Angel for Satan (1966)
 A Stranger in Paso Bravo (1968)
 Ivanhoe, the Norman Swordsman (1971)
 He Was Called Holy Ghost (1971)
 His Name Was King  (1971)
 Return of Sabata (1971)
 The Arena (1974)
 Cosmos: War of the Planets (1977)
 Cindy's Love Games (1978) 
 Giallo a Venezia (1979)
 Scalps (1987)
 Last Platoon (1988)
 Leathernecks (1989)
 Women in Arms (1991)

References

External links 
 

Italian male film actors
1938 births
Living people
Actors from Patras
Greek emigrants to Italy
Male Spaghetti Western actors